The 1946 Newark Eagles were a baseball team that competed in Negro National League during the 1946 baseball season.  The team compiled a 56–24–3 record and won the 1946 Negro World Series, defeating the Kansas City Monarchs four games to three.

Biz Mackey was the team's manager. Shortstop Monte Irvin and second baseman Larry Doby were the team's leading hitters. Leon Day and Max Manning were the leading pitchers.

Statistics

Batting 
Note: Pos = Position; G = Games played; AB = At bats; H = Hits; Avg. = Batting average; HR = Home runs; SLG = Slugging percentage

Pitching 
Note: G = Games; IP = Innings pitched; W = Wins; L = Losses; PCT = Win percentage; ERA = Earned run average; SO = Strikeouts

References

1946 in sports in New Jersey
Newark Eagles
Negro league baseball seasons